Odra Wodzisław Śląski Spółka z o.o., is a Polish football club based in Wodzisław Śląski, Poland.

History
The club was established in 1922 as Odra Wodzisław, then changed its name several times. After the Second World War and until 1963 the club was linked closely to the Polish State Railways (PKP), so the club bore the nickname Kolejarz, which means The Railwaymen. From 1963 until 1974, the club took the name Górnik (miner), as the club is based in Upper Silesia, known for its coal-mining industry. Then, the club reverted to its traditional name, Odra, after the Oder River).

After several decades in the second and third tiers of the league system, Odra were promoted to the Polish Ekstraklasa for the first time in 1996. The team continued to develop over the following years, achieving 3rd place in their first season at this level before settling into mid-table placings over the following decade. From 2007, however, league positions worsened until the club was finally relegated to the I liga in 2010. In spite of this, Odra did manage to reach the final of the Ekstraklasa Cup in 2009, losing to regional rivals Śląsk Wrocław. During the 2010–11 season, Odra underwent severe financial difficulties, often struggling to raise enough money to travel to away fixtures. This affected on-field performance and a second successive relegation followed. The summer of 2011 saw the Odra board declare themselves bankrupt and dissolve the club, with fans reforming as Klub Piłkarski Odra 1922 Wodzisław. This new club joined the lowest rung of the Polish league ladder for the 2011–12 season. 1. July 2012 Odra acquisition a licence for III Polish league.

Stadium

Odra using multi-purpose stadium Miejskiego Ośrodka Sportu i Rekreacji (MOSiR). The stadium has a capacity of 7,400 people.

Biggest Achievements
 Ekstraklasa:
 3rd Place:(1): 1997
 Polish Cup:
 Semi-Finalist:(1): 1997
 Ekstraklasa Cup:
 Finalist:(1): 2009
 Semi-Finalist:(1): 2000

Odra in European Cups

Notable coaches
 Waldemar Fornalik
 Stanisław Oślizło
 Franciszek Smuda
 Ryszard Wieczorek
 Jerzy Wyrobek
 Jacek Zieliński

See also
 Football in Poland
 List of football teams
 Champions' Cup/League
 UEFA Cup

References

External links
 Official website (odra.wodzislaw.pl)
 Unofficial website (90minut.pl)

 
Sport in Wodzisław Śląski
Association football clubs established in 1922
1922 establishments in Poland